Goaldih railway station is a railway station on the East Coast Railway network in the state of Odisha, India. It serves Goaldih village. Its code is GADH. It has two platforms. Express trains halt at Goaldih railway station. It is the place where the rivers Ganga and Brahmaputra meet.

Major trains
 Puri–Barbil Express

See also
 Kendujhar district

References

Railway stations in Kendujhar district
Khurda Road railway division